East London Credit Union Limited was a not-for-profit member-owned financial co-operative, based in Walthamstow and operating in the east London boroughs of Waltham Forest, Enfield, Haringey, Hackney, Newham, Redbridge and the Epping Forest district of Essex. All members of the credit union were instant savers; different loans were provided depending on individual circumstances.

Waltham Forest Community Credit Union (not to be confused with the separate Waltham Forest Council Employees Credit Union) was formed in 2003. It became East London Community Credit Union and finally, East London Credit Union in 2015.

A member of the Association of British Credit Unions Limited, registered under the Industrial and Provident Societies Acts, East London Credit Union was authorised by the Prudential Regulation Authority and regulated by the Financial Conduct Authority and PRA. Ultimately, like the banks and building societies, members' savings were protected against business failure by the Financial Services Compensation Scheme.

The credit union went into administration and the FSCS declared it in default on 11 September 2019.

See also
Credit unions in the United Kingdom
British co-operative movement

References

External links
East London Credit Union
Association of British Credit Unions

Credit unions of the United Kingdom
Financial services companies based in London
Banks established in 2003